Shirin van Anrooij (born 5 February 2002) is a Dutch professional racing cyclist, who currently rides for UCI Women's WorldTeam . and UCI Cyclo-Cross Pro Team Baloise Trek Lions. She earned the young rider classification at the 2022 Tour de France Femmes.On November 13, 2022 in the 2022–23 UCI Cyclo-cross World Cup Shirin took her first World Cup victory surprising the "Big Two" Fem Van Empel and Puck Pieterse to form what is now often referred to by commentators as "The Big Three".
On Feb 5th 2023 Shirin won The UCI Cyclo-cross World Championships - Women's under-23 race.

Major results

Cyclo-cross

2018–2019
 3rd Contern
2019–2020
 1st  UCI World Junior Championships
 1st  National Junior Championships
 1st Contern
 1st Pétange
 2nd Mol
 3rd  UEC European Junior Championships
 DVV Trophy
3rd Lille
 Rectavit Series
3rd Neerpelt
 3rd Gullegem
2021–2022
 1st  UEC European Under-23 Championships
 1st Gullegem
 1st Iowa City
 Ethias Cross
2nd Beringen
 2nd  UCI World Under-23 Championships
 2nd National Under-23 Championships
 X²O Badkamers Trophy
2nd Hamme
3rd Loenhout
2022–2023
 1st  UCI World Under-23 Championships
 3rd Overall UCI World Cup
1st Beekse Bergen
1st Gavere
1st Zonhoven
3rd Maasmechelen
3rd Overijse
3rd Hulst
3rd Antwerpen
3rd Benidorm
 X²O Badkamers Trophy
1st Koksijde
2nd Hamme
3rd Koppenberg
 Exact Cross
1st Mol
1st Loenhout
 2nd Ardooie
 3rd  UEC European Under-23 Championships
 Superprestige
3rd Boom

Road
2022
 UEC European Under-23 Championships
1st  Road race
1st  Time trial
 1st  Time trial, National Under-23 Championships
 1st  Young rider classification, Tour de France
 2nd  Time trial, UCI World Under-23 Championships
 5th Omloop van het Hageland
 7th Le Samyn
 9th Strade Bianche
2023
 1st Trofeo Alfredo Binda

References

External links

2002 births
Living people
Dutch female cyclists
Cyclo-cross cyclists
Sportspeople from Goes
Cyclists from Zeeland
21st-century Dutch women